The 2019 NAIA Division II Men's Basketball national championship was held in March 2019 at Sanford Pentagon in Sioux Falls, South Dakota. The 28th annual NAIA basketball tournament featured 32 teams playing in a single-elimination format. The championship game was won by Spring Arbor (Mich.) Cougars over the Oregon Tech Hustlin' Owls by a score of 82 to 76.

2019 Bracket

See also
2019 NAIA Division I men's basketball tournament
2019 NCAA Division I men's basketball tournament
2019 NCAA Division II men's basketball tournament
2019 NCAA Division III men's basketball tournament
2019 NAIA Division II women's basketball tournament

References

NAIA Men's Basketball Championship
2019 in sports in South Dakota
Tournament